Nanzie Adeline Gouenon (born 20 October 1994) is an Ivorian athlete specialising in the sprinting events. She won several medals with her country's 4 × 100 metres relay.

Competition record

1Did not start in the final

Personal bests
Outdoor
100 metres – 11.49 (+0.6 m/s) (Brazzaville 2015)
200 metres – 24.08 (-0.5 m/s) (Brazzaville 2015)
Indoor
60 metres – 7.36 (Sheffield 2015)
200 metres – 24.19 (Sheffield 2015)

References

1994 births
Living people
Ivorian female sprinters
Athletes (track and field) at the 2015 African Games
African Games bronze medalists for Ivory Coast
African Games medalists in athletics (track and field)